Lepojević (Serbian Cyrillic: Лепојевић) is a village in Šumadija and Western Serbia (Šumadija), in the municipality of Rekovac (Region of Levač), lying at , at the elevation of 340 m. According to the 2002 census, the village had 362 citizens.

External links
 Levac Online
 Article about Lepojević

Populated places in Pomoravlje District
Šumadija